Miramontes is a Spanish-language surname. People with the surname include:

 Isabel Miramontes (born 1962), Spanish-born Belgian sculptor
 Jonathan Miramontes (born 1988), Mexican professional footballer
 Luis E. Miramontes (1925–2004), Mexican chemist
 Matías Miramontes (born 1981), Argentine footballer
 David Fernández (footballer, born 1976) (David Fernández Miramontes), Spanish footballer
 Luis Suárez (footballer, born 1935) (Luis Suárez Miramontes), Spanish footballer and manager

See also
 Rancho Miramontes, Mexican land grant in present-day San Mateo County, California
 Miramonte (disambiguation)

Spanish-language surnames